King's Ransom is a 2005 American black comedy film directed by Jeffrey W. Byrd and written by Wayne Conley, who was a writer for the Nickelodeon TV series, Kenan & Kel. The film stars Anthony Anderson, Jay Mohr, Kellita Smith, Regina Hall, Donald Faison, Nicole Ari Parker, Charlie Murphy, Loretta Devine, Brooke D'Orsay, and Leila Arcieri. King's Ransom was released in the United States on April 22, 2005, and was a critical and commercial failure, grossing $4,143,652 against a budget of $15 million.

Plot
Malcolm King is a wealthy, selfish, obnoxious businessman who is about to divorce his wife Renee. She plans to ruin him financially during the court proceedings, and King is willing to do anything to protect his fortune.

He enlists his mistress, Peaches, and her brother, Herb, to stage a mock kidnapping. They are to make and receive a huge ransom demand, which would keep the money safe from his wife.

Unfortunately for him, two other people have similar plans to kidnap him; Angela, an aggrieved employee and Corey, a good-natured yet hapless nobody who lives in his grandmother's basement and needs $10,000 after being threatened by his adopted sister.

Cast
 Anthony Anderson as Malcolm King
 Jay Mohr as Corey
 Kellita Smith as Renee King
 Donald Faison as Andre
 Regina Hall as Peaches Clarke
 Nicole Ari Parker as Angela Drake
 Loretta Devine as Miss Gladys
 Charlie Murphy as Herb Clarke
 Leila Arcieri as Kim Baker
 Brooke D'Orsay as Brooke Mayo
 Roger Cross as Byron
 Jackie Burroughs as Granny
 Christian Potenza as Officer Holland
 Lawrence Dane as Detective Conley
 Lisa Marcos as Raven
 Robert Norman Smith as David
 Brenda Chrichlow as Anita
 Carrie Colak as Lori
 Kwasi Songui as Ronald
 Ingrid Hart as Sheila
 Luis Oliva as Pablo
 Ilona Elkin as Rachel
 Nicolas Wright as Timmy
 Lila Yee as Miss Ho

Reception

Box office
King's Ransom was produced on a $15 million budget, but only grossed $2,137,685 on its opening weekend and ranked at #10 at the box office. It was released in 1,508 theaters and had $1,417 average. The film eventually closed on June 2, 2005 upon grossing $4,008,527 in the domestic market, and $135,125 in the foreign market for a worldwide total of $4,143,652. Altogether, the film ended up a huge disappointment, commercially.

Critical response
On review aggregation website Rotten Tomatoes the film has an approval rating of 2% based on 50 reviews, with an average rating of 2.4/10. The site's consensus states: "Filled with crass dialogue, unlikable characters, and overdone slapstick gags, King's Ransom is an utterly inept would-be comedy." On Metacritic, which assigns a weighted average score, the film has a score of 11 out of 100 based on 13 reviews, indicating "overwhelming dislike".

References

External links
 
 

2005 films
African-American films
American buddy comedy films
2000s buddy comedy films
2000s crime comedy films
2005 directorial debut films
American crime comedy films
New Line Cinema films
2005 comedy films
Films directed by Jeffrey W. Byrd
2000s English-language films
2000s American films